Pusiola monotonia is a moth in the  subfamily Arctiinae. It was described by Strand in 1912. It is found in Cameroon.

References

Natural History Museum Lepidoptera generic names catalog

Endemic fauna of Cameroon
Moths described in 1912
Lithosiini
Moths of Africa